The Ultimate Collection: Music + Video – 1991–1996 is the second video album, third compilation album and twelfth album overall by Greek pop-rock singer-songwriter Sakis Rouvas. The album comprises two discs, one CD and one DVD, released in early 2005 by Universal Music Greece and comprises songs from his first five albums released under the former PolyGram Records Greece. The album contains 20 of his first hit singles and 13 of his music videos.

Track listing
CD
"Par'ta"
"1992"
"Gyrna"
"Min Andistekese"
"Yia Fantasou"
"Me Kommeni Tin Anasa"
"Na Ziseis Moro Mou"
"Kane Me"
"To Xero Ise Moni"
"Xehase To"
"Aima, Dakrya & Idrotas"
"Xana"
"Ela Mou"
"Symplegma Idipodio"
"Grothia"
"Tora Arhizoun Ta Dyskola"
"Ase Me Na Fygo"
"Mi M'agapiseis"
"Afiste Tin"
"Pou ke Pote"

DVD
"Ela Mou"
"Tora Arhizoun Ta Dyskola"
"Afiste Tin"
"Aima, Dakrya & Idrotas"
"Pou ke Pote"
"Min Andistekese"
"Par'ta"
"Kane Me"
"To Xero Ise Moni"
"Xehase To"
"Xana"
"1992"
"Mia Fora"

External links
 Sakis Rouvas official site

2005 video albums
Albums produced by Nikos Karvelas
Albums produced by Nikos Terzis
Greek-language albums
Sakis Rouvas video albums
Live video albums
Sakis Rouvas compilation albums
2005 live albums
2005 compilation albums
Universal Music Greece compilation albums
Universal Music Greece video albums
Universal Music Greece live albums